Thomas Roper (1533/34–1598) was an English politician.

He was the eldest son of William Roper of St Dunstan's, Canterbury and Eltham, Kent and educated at Lincoln's Inn.

He was a Member (MP) of the Parliament of England for New Shoreham in October 1553 and for Newport, Cornwall in 1558.

He married Lucy, the daughter of Sir Anthony Browne of Cowdray, Sussex, with whom he had 5 sons and 5 daughters.

References

 

1534 births
1598 deaths
Members of Lincoln's Inn
Members of the pre-1707 English Parliament for constituencies in Cornwall
English MPs 1553 (Mary I)
English MPs 1558